Atlanta is a city in Macon County, Missouri, United States. The population was 379 at the 2020 census.

History
Atlanta was platted in 1858. The community was named after Atlanta, Georgia. A post office called Atlanta has been in operation since 1868.

On May 6, 1935, a TWA DC-2 en route from Los Angeles, California, to Washington, D.C., became lost in heavy fog near Atlanta. Running out of fuel, the pilot attempted an emergency landing but crashed, which killed four and injured several others. Among the dead was Senator Bronson Cutting of New Mexico. The crash made national headlines and prompted Congress to commission the Copeland Committee report on air traffic safety.

Geography
Atlanta is located at  (39.899177, -92.480161).

Demographics

2010 census
As of the census of 2010, there were 385 people, 157 households, and 104 families residing in the city. The racial makeup of the city was 97.1% White, 0.3% African American, 0.5% Native American, and 2.1% from two or more races. Hispanic or Latino of any race were 0.3% of the population.

There were 157 households, of which 38.2% had children under the age of 18 living with them, 45.2% were married couples living together, 14.6% had a female householder with no husband present, 6.4% had a male householder with no wife present, and 33.8% were non-families. 30.6% of all households were made up of individuals, and 14.7% had someone living alone who was 65 years of age or older. The average household size was 2.45 and the average family size was 2.99.

The median age in the city was 37.9 years. 28.1% of residents were under the age of 18; 5.1% were between the ages of 18 and 24; 28.6% were from 25 to 44; 22.1% were from 45 to 64; and 16.1% were 65 years of age or older. The gender makeup of the city was 47.3% male and 52.7% female.

2000 census
As of the census of 2000, there were 450 people, 173 households, and 129 families residing in the city. The population density was 1,314.2 people per square mile (511.0/km2). There were 199 housing units at an average density of 581.2/sq mi (226.0/km2). The racial makeup of the city was 99.11% White, 0.22% Native American, and 0.67% from two or more races.

There were 173 households, out of which 39.3% had children under the age of 18 living with them, 56.1% were married couples living together, 15.6% had a female householder with no husband present, and 25.4% were non-families. 23.1% of all households were made up of individuals, and 8.7% had someone living alone who was 65 years of age or older. The average household size was 2.60 and the average family size was 3.03.

In the city the population was spread out, with 30.7% under the age of 18, 7.8% from 18 to 24, 30.7% from 25 to 44, 18.9% from 45 to 64, and 12.0% who were 65 years of age or older. The median age was 31 years. For every 100 females there were 90.7 males. For every 100 females age 18 and over, there were 84.6 males.

The median income for a household in the city was $33,571, and the median income for a family was $39,271. Males had a median income of $25,673 versus $16,875 for females. The per capita income for the city was $14,940. About 7.3% of families and 9.1% of the population were below the poverty line, including 8.5% of those under age 18 and 11.5% of those age 65 or over.

Sports and external affiliations 
Atlanta residents are known for their love for their local "Hornets" sports teams and the local school colors of blue and white. Atlanta's local high school is affiliated with MSHSAA. In 1998, the Atlanta Lady Hornets won first in state in basketball, with a record of 31–0. In 2015, the Hornets lost their state game coming into second place in the 1-A class.

- (*) Denotes state-appearance - (^) Denotes current season

Churches
The Atlanta community is home to several churches, including small country churches outside of city limits. There are two churches inside the City of Atlanta - Atlanta Christian Church and Atlanta First Baptist Church.

Annual events

The community hosts the "Atlanta Homecoming" every last full weekend in June in the town center, Atterberry Park.

Other downtown activities include the annual "Big Wheels" event hosted by the Atlanta PTO every September and an egg hunt hosted by Crossroads Christian Church of Macon, the Saturday before Easter every year.

Sports activities at the school include a Little Dribblers Tournament hosted by the PTO in March and the Pee Wee Baseball Tournament held in May.

Education
The local school district, Atlanta C-3 school district averages about 200 students, K-12, annually. In 2007, the district was recognized as a National Blue Ribbon School by the United States Department of Education.

In 2019, Atlanta Elementary was ranked 7th out of 1,039 elementary schools in Missouri, based on Missouri's assessment program test scores.

The Home Pioneer 4-H Club is based in Atlanta and currently has 90 members, making it one of the largest 4-H clubs in Missouri.

Recreation
Visitors to the area include hunters seeking whitetail deer and turkey.

There is a plethora of areas and parks that are protected by the Missouri Department of Conservation.

Notable people

 Andrew Taylor Still, considered the founder of osteopathic medicine, lived in the Atlanta area (rural Barnesville) as a young adult and local teacher. Barnesville is in the Atlanta ZIP Code and school district.
 Milton Romjue, Democrat, served in the United States Congress from 1917 to 1921 and again from 1923 to 1943. He attended local schools and lived east of the Love Lake area, now in the Atlanta ZIP Code and school district. Romjue was a postal service reformer and supporter of President Franklin D. Roosevelt's New Deal legislation - especially Social Security, help for farmers, and wounded military veterans. The congressman also worked closely with other Missouri politicians to secure for the state military bases such as Fort Leonard Wood and Camp Crowder as America geared up for World War II. Romjue also served as a county judge.

External links
 Historic Sanborn Map of Atlanta (1918) from University of Missouri Digital Library

References

Cities in Missouri
Cities in Macon County, Missouri
1858 establishments in Missouri